Dipeptidyl carboxypeptidase may refer to:

 Angiotensin-converting enzyme (ACE)
 Peptidyl-dipeptidase Dcp